Anolis ortonii, the bark anole or Orton's anole, is a species of lizard in the family Dactyloidae. The specific name ortonii honors James Orton.

The species is found in the northern South America east of the Andes, in Brazil, French Guiana, Suriname, Guyana, Venezuela, Ecuador, Colombia, Peru, and Bolivia.

References

Anoles
Lizards of South America
Reptiles of Brazil
Reptiles of Bolivia
Reptiles of Colombia
Reptiles of Ecuador
Reptiles of French Guiana
Reptiles of Guyana
Reptiles of Peru
Reptiles of Suriname
Reptiles of Venezuela
Reptiles described in 1868
Taxa named by Edward Drinker Cope